The following is detailed episode information chronicling the televised storylines of the original run of Dark Shadows episodes, broadcast from 1966 to 1971.

Dark Shadows